Mariano Rubbo Ferrari was born May 28, 1988, in Montevideo, and is an Uruguayan footballer currently playing for Colmenar Viejo in Spain.

Teams
  Defensor Sporting 2008-2009
  Tacuarembó 2010
  Miramar Misiones 2011
  Criciuma 2011
  Paysandú 2011
  Colmenar Viejo 2012
  Wanderers de Santa Lucía 2013–present

External links
 
 

1988 births
Living people
Uruguayan footballers
Uruguayan expatriate footballers
Defensor Sporting players
Tacuarembó F.C. players
Miramar Misiones players
Paysandu Sport Club players
Criciúma Esporte Clube players
Expatriate footballers in Brazil
Expatriate footballers in Spain
Association football midfielders